Vladimir Vasilyevich Fedoseev (born 16 February 1995) is a Russian chess grandmaster. He competed in the FIDE World Cup in 2015, 2017, and 2021.

Career
Fedoseev tied for second place in the Chigorin Memorial 2010 tournament, finishing seventh on tiebreak. In 2011, Fedoseev won the under 18 section of the Russian Youth Championships and finished runner-up in the same division at the World Youth Chess Championship. In the same year, he played for the gold medal-winning Russian team in the World Youth U-16 Chess Olympiad in Kocaeli, Turkey.

In 2012, Fedoseev tied for first place with Alexei Shirov in the Paul Keres Memorial rapid tournament in Tallinn, finishing second after playoffs. In 2013, in Budva, Montenegro, he won the under-18 division of the European Youth Chess Championship, and also won the blitz and rapid events in the under-18 category.

Fedoseev won the bronze medal at the 2014 European Individual Chess Championship in Yerevan, therefore qualifying for the 2015 FIDE World Cup. Later that year, he finished third in the "Lake Sevan" round-robin tournament in Martuni, Armenia and in the World Junior Chess Championship. In December 2014, he took part in the "Nutcracker Match of the Generations", a match between two teams, Princes (made up of Vladislav Artemiev, Daniil Dubov, Fedoseev, and Grigoriy Oparin) and Kings (Alexei Dreev, Peter Leko, Alexander Morozevich, and Alexei Shirov), held in Moscow with the Scheveningen system. Fedoseev was the top scorer of the event with 11/16 points.

In January 2015, he won the Vladimir Dvorkovich Memorial in Taganrog. In April of that year, he tied for first place in the Dubai Open, placing third on tiebreak; he also won the blitz tournament from the event.
In 2016 Fedoseev shared first place in the Grenke Chess Open in Karlsruhe, Germany with Matthias Bluebaum, Nikita Vitiugov, Miloš Perunović, Ni Hua, and Francisco Vallejo Pons, taking second place on tiebreak.

In March 2017 Fedoseev came first in the Aeroflot Open. This victory earned him an invitation to the Dortmund Sparkassen Chess Meeting, held in July of the same year. In this event he won against Vladimir Kramnik in the opening round and eventually finished second, edging out Maxime Vachier-Lagrave on tiebreak. In June 2017, Fedoseev tied for first place with Maxim Matlakov and Baadur Jobava in the European Individual Championship in Minsk and took the bronze medal on tiebreak. Later in the same month, Fedoseev was part of the Russian team which won the silver medal in the World Team Chess Championship in Khanty-Mansiysk. In September, he reached the quarterfinals of the World Cup in Tbilisi, after knocking out Yusnel Bacallao Alonso, Ernesto Inarkiev, Hikaru Nakamura and Maxim Rodshtein. Fedoseev was then eliminated from the competition by Wesley So. Two months later, Fedoseev won the Urii Eliseev Memorial in Moscow with a score of 4½/5 points. In December he shared 3rd-4th places with Daniil Dubov in the Russian Championship Superfinal in St. Petersburg, finishing fourth on tiebreak, and won the silver medal in the World Rapid Chess Championship in Riyadh, after losing the playoff to Viswanathan Anand.

Through February and March 2022, Fedoseev played in the FIDE Grand Prix 2022. In the first leg, he placed third in Pool B with a 3/6 result. In the second leg, he tied for third with Alexei Shirov in Pool C with a result of 2.5/6, finishing 19th in the standings with three points.

Notes

References

External links
 
 
 
 
 Vladimir Fedoseev team chess records at Olimpbase.org
 "Fedoseev on crossing the 2700 barrier" (interview by Dorsa Derakhshani). chess24.com. 2017-06-01.

1995 births
Living people
Chess grandmasters
Russian chess players
Sportspeople from Saint Petersburg